The 1874 North Northamptonshire by-election was fought on 18 March 1874.  The byelection was fought due to the incumbent Conservative MP, George Ward Hunt, becoming First Lord of the Admiralty.  It was retained by the incumbent.

References

1874 elections in the United Kingdom
1874 in England
19th century in Northamptonshire
By-elections to the Parliament of the United Kingdom in Northamptonshire constituencies
Unopposed ministerial by-elections to the Parliament of the United Kingdom in English constituencies
March 1874 events